Alex Roberts is a Canadian tabletop role-playing game designer. Her games typically lack a gamemaster (GM) and include romantic themes.

Games 

Roberts made Star Crossed (Bully Pulpit Games), a game about forbidden romantic pairings, which won the 2019 Diana Jones Award. She designed For the Queen (Evil Hat Productions), a GM-less storytelling card game that initiated genre of games called "Descended from the Queen."

Roberts also did design work for Till the Last Gasp, a 2-player dueling game published by Critical Role's Darrington Press. She wrote the game Hero Dog Saves Town for The Ultimate Micro-RPG Book. She wrote the LARP Pop! about an internet forum for balloon fetishists in the anthology Honey & Hot Wax.

Roberts was the host of the role-playing games podcast "Backstory" on the One Shot Podcast Network from 2016 to 2019.

In game scholarship 

Brittany N. Arde at the University of Cincinnati 
used Roberts' For the Queen in a psychological study on the influence of storytelling games on team building.

References 

Year of birth missing (living people)
Living people
Date of birth missing (living people)
Canadian game designers
Board game award winners